Seven Warriors (Chinese: 忠義群英) is a 1989 Hong Kong action film directed by Terry Tong and starring Adam Cheng, Jacky Cheung, Max Mok and Tony Leung Chiu-Wai with a guest appearance by Sammo Hung. This film is a homage to the 1954 Japanese film Seven Samurai.

Plot
The story takes place during the Warlord Era in China where many soldiers became bandits, doing evil nuisances to farmers. In Guangxi, a small village often suffers from bandits robbing and in order to defend their homeland, the villagers hire seven warriors to protect them against bandits infringement. The seven warriors led the villages to prepare for war and together with their combined efforts, they finally defeat the bandits.

Cast
Adam Cheng as General Chik
Jacky Cheung as Ching Ka
Max Mok as Yung
Tony Leung Chiu-Wai as Wong Wai-mo
Wu Ma as Old Man
Shing Fui-On as Kau
Ben Lam as Mau Tin-lui
Lo Lieh as Ma Cheng-piu
Elaine Jin
Gregory Lee as Fung Sau
Yip San
Sammo Hung as Hung Sap-kan (cameo)
Fung Hak-on as Wu Long (cameo)
Lisa Chiao Chiao as Aunt Ping cameo)
Shum Wai as Master Kam (cameo)
Philip Kwok as Ngau
Thomas Wong
Yeung Sing as bandit
Bak Man-biu as Village head
Chan King as Hang
David Ho as muscle man
Yiu Yau-hung as Master Kam's bandit
Wong Kwok-fai as villager
Leung Sam as villager
Ho Chi-moon as villager
Kong Long as bandit
Wong Ka-leung as bandit and fighter
Chui Kin-wah as old fighter
Dion Lam as bandit
Lam Chi-tai as villager
Tam Wai-man as bandit
Lau Shung-fung as bandit
Chung Wing as thug
Ma Yuk-sing as thug
Derek Kok as bandit
Lam Fu-wah as bandit
Choi Hin-cheung as bandit
Lee Yiu-king as guard
Wan Seung-lam
Kong Chuen

Box office
This film grossed HK$6,646,992 at the Hong Kong box office during its theatrical run from 26 August to 13 September 1989 in Hong Kong.

See also
Jacky Cheung filmography
Sammo Hung filmography
Seven Samurai

External links

Seven Warriors at Hong Kong Cinemagic

1989 films
1989 action thriller films
1989 martial arts films
1980s action drama films
Hong Kong action thriller films
Hong Kong martial arts films
Gun fu films
1980s Cantonese-language films
Films set in the 1920s
1989 drama films
1980s Hong Kong films